John Duncan Inverarity  (7 January 1847, Bombay – 4 December 1923, Bombay) was an eminent barrister and naturalist who worked in Bombay.

John Duncan Inverarity was son of Jonathan Duncan Inverarity (1812 - 1882) and Maria Martha Willoughby (d. 1871) and was born in Bombay in 1847. He went to study at Cheltenham College in England. He went to study law, and his contemporaries included Arthur Cohen and Spencer Perceval Butler. He joined as a Barrister in Bombay in 1869. He was called to bar at the Inner Temple in 1870. Apart from being a barrister in the Bombay High Court he was a keen outdoorsman and big game hunter and one of the early members of the Bombay Natural History Society, serving as its vice president from 1897 till his death. He contributed short notes to A.O. Hume's Stray Feathers, the Journal of the Bombay Natural History Society on the tiger, water buffalo, and entries on tiger hunting in the Encyclopedia of Sport (1898). He was attacked by a lioness that he was hunting near Berbera in 1889, an incident that gathered considerable news coverage. He recounted the event in the Journal of the Bombay Natural History Society and wrote about how surprisingly painless the attack was. He married Margaret Eweretta, elder daughter of F.G. Forsyth-Grant of Kincardineshire in 1896.

In James Joyce's book A Portrait of the Artist as a Young Man, the main character, Stephen Daedalus, owns a copy of Horace's verses owned by the brothers John and William Duncan Inverarity with notes in Latin pencilled on the margin.

Inverarity died at Bombay and is buried at the Sewree Christian Cemetery.

References

External links
 Legal Legends
 John Duncan Inverarity Mauled by a Lioness, Somaliland - painting by George Fiddes Watt (1873–1960)
 Portrait by George Fiddes Watt (1873–1960)

Bombay High Court
1847 births
1923 deaths
Members of the Bombay Natural History Society